Christopher, Washington was a former community, north of Auburn in the Green River Valley of King County in the U.S. state of Washington. It was on the west bank of the river. At one time, it had a post office and a school.

A post office called Christopher was established in 1887, and remained in operation until 1917. The community was named after Thomas Christopher, an early settler.  The community of Thomas stood nearby.

Notes

Ghost towns in King County, Washington